A road diet (also called a lane reduction, road rechannelization or road conversion) is a technique in transportation planning whereby the number of travel lanes and/or effective width of the road is reduced in order to achieve systemic improvements.

Techniques

A typical road diet technique is to reduce the number of lanes on a roadway cross-section. One of the most common applications of a road diet is to improve safety or provide space for other modes of travel.  For example, a two-way, four lane road might be reduced to one travel lane in each direction. The freed-up space is then used to provide or enhance some of the following features:

Adding or widening of footpaths/sidewalks
Adding or widening of boulevards (landscaping strips)
Adding cycle lanes on one or both sides of the road
Adding reserved tramtracks, usually in the middle of the road
Widening remaining traffic lanes (if previously unsafely narrow to allow four lanes)
Adding a center turn lane / flush traffic median for turning traffic
Adding a reversible center lane
Conversion of the rightmost or leftmost travel lane to a breakdown lane (The Lodge Freeway in metro Detroit is an example of this after I-96, the Jeffries Freeway, was built.)

If properly designed, traffic does not divert to other streets after a road diet, because the road previously provided excessive capacity. In other scenarios, reduction of traffic (either local traffic or overall traffic) is intended in the scheme. Road diets are usually successful on roads carrying fewer than 19,000 vehicles per day. Road diets can succeed at volumes up to about 23,000 vehicles per day. However, more extensive reconstruction is needed. Examples include replacing signals with roundabouts, traffic calming on parallel streets to discourage traffic from diverting away from the main road, and other means to keep traffic moving smoothly and uniformly.

Lane diets
In a lane diet, the width of a lane is decreased to reduce vehicle speeds and yield space for other use. Resulting space can be applied to pedestrian refuges, medians, sidewalks, shoulders, parking, or bike lanes.

Benefits

Researchers and the U.S. Department of Transportation (Federal Highway Administration) have found that road diets can be expected to reduce overall crash frequency by 19% to 43%, with the higher crash reductions occurring in small urban areas than in metropolitan areas.

Dan Burden and Peter Lagerwey a 1999 article noted that in two cases, 95% of residents were initially opposed to roadway constriction. Additional studies have shown that road diets often achieve these positive effects without reducing traffic volumes.

Criticisms

Not all multi-lane arterials are good candidates for road constriction. Added congestion can outweigh benefits if vehicle traffic volumes exceed the capacity of the three-lane roadway. This threshold is approximately 20,000 vehicles per day.

Effects on evacuation speed during wildfires
Other concerns regard public safety; police, fire and ambulances may be slowed and if an evacuation is ordered, the evacuation will be slower. One example of road diets being accused of this effect is during the evacuations of the 2018 Camp Fire which killed at least 88 people and destroyed the town of Paradise, California. Out of four evacuation routes out of Paradise, three of which were narrow, two-lane mountain roads, the fourth, Skyway Boulevard, was the only artery that could effectively handle high amounts of traffic. A grand jury investigation for a similar fire nearby in 2008 had recommended “immediate modification of Skyway, from Paradise to Chico, as an emergency evacuation route, by removing trees and brush and creating fire barriers on both sides of the road.” However, in 2012, the county government decided to narrow the boulevard by replacing traffic lanes with bike lanes, bulb-outs, and other traffic calming measures. Critics of road dieting blamed the narrowing of the boulevard for causing gridlock, thus trapping evacuating drivers in the fire.

Examples of implementation by country

United Kingdom 
During the Covid-19 pandemic, London implemented a number of road diets to give more space to active travel modes such as bicycle lanes, on a number of its roads. For example, the formerly three-lane northbound carriageway of Park Lane was reduced to one lane for motor traffic, one bus lane and one segregated cycle way.

United States 
Among American cities, San Francisco has completed the most road diet projects, over 40 since the late 1970s. Valencia Street, which was reduced from four to two travel lanes with a center turn lane and bike lanes added in March 1999, has become a national model for traffic engineers of the common "4-to-3 lane" road diet type.

San Jose, California has implemented several road diets since November 2011, when the City Council unanimously adopted its "Envision 2040" General Plan, which calls for road diets on streets with excess vehicle capacity "to provide wider sidewalks, bicycle lanes, transit amenities, and/or landscaping". Road diets were completed on 3rd, 4th, 10th, and 11th streets in August 2012, and on Hedding Street in July 2013.

Constricting traffic arteries has been controversial in Los Angeles, California, where traffic fatalities increased 32% since beginning its Vision Zero road diet plan in 2015.

Palo Alto, California has studied reducing the number of travel lanes to improve safety on some of its busiest streets since adopting a new Comprehensive Plan in 1998. Design plans were made for road diets on Embarcadero Road and Middlefield Road in the early 2000s, but were never brought to the city council for approval. 75-yr-old local resident Ming Yuan Zuo was killed by a pickup truck driver while walking across Embarcadero Road in January 2013. Lane reductions were approved and then implemented on Charleston Road in 2006, Arastradero Road in 2010, and Deer Creek Road in 2011.

In Tampa, Florida, Nebraska Avenue between its intersection with Hillsborough Avenue (US 92-US 41-FL 600) and Adamo Drive was reduced from four to three lanes, complete with bicycle lanes, a left turn lane and embedded bus stops for HART buses. Construction was completed in 2009.

In Rutland, Vermont, the city briefly converted Woodstock Avenue from a four-lane road to a three-lane road with bicycle lanes on each side. However, due mainly to opposition from businesses alongside the road  in June 2014, Woodstock Avenue was returned to its previous four-lane configuration.

In Waverly, Iowa the city converted Bremer Avenue from a four-lane road to a three-lane road with a safety buffer on each side. The city faced criticism due to some citizens’ belief the change has caused slower emergency response time.

See also
Reversible lane
Contraflow lane reversal
2+1 road
Street hierarchy

References

Transportation planning
Repurposing